Yvette Carmen Mimieux (January 8, 1942 – January 18, 2022) was an American film and television actress.  Her breakout role was in The Time Machine (1960). She was nominated for three Golden Globe Awards during her acting career.

Early life and career
Mimieux was born in Los Angeles, California, on January 8, 1942, to René Mimieux, who was French, and Maria Montemayor, who was Mexican. Mimieux had at least two siblings, a sister, Gloria, and a brother Edouardo.

Her career was launched after a talent manager, Jim Byron, suggested she become an actress. Her first acting appearances were in episodes of the television shows Yancy Derringer and One Step Beyond, both in 1959, at the age of 17.

MGM
Mimieux appeared in George Pal's film version of H. G. Wells's 1895 novel The Time Machine (1960) starring Rod Taylor, in which she played the character Weena. It was made for MGM, which put her under long-term contract. However, her first film was Platinum High School (1960), produced by Albert Zugsmith for MGM and released two months before The Time Machine. Her performance in Platinum High School earned her a 1960 Golden Globe Awards nomination for "New Star Of The Year - Actress".

Mimieux guest-starred in an episode of Mr Lucky, then was one of several leads in the highly popular teen comedy Where the Boys Are (1960). MGM put Mimieux in the ingenue role in Four Horsemen of the Apocalypse (1961), an expensive flop. Arthur Freed wanted to team her and George Hamilton in a remake of The Clock, but it was not made.

Mimieux had a central role in Light in the Piazza (1962), playing a mentally disabled girl. The film lost money but was well regarded critically. She later said: "I suppose I have a soulful quality. I was often cast as a wounded person, the 'sensitive' role."

Mimieux was slated for a role in A Summer Affair at MGM, but it was not made.

Mimieux had a small part in Pal's The Wonderful World of the Brothers Grimm (1963), another commercial disappointment. Later that year, she appeared in Diamond Head (1963) with Charlton Heston. Mimieux went to United Artists for Toys in the Attic, based on the play by Lillian Hellman and co-starring Geraldine Page and Dean Martin. At MGM, Mimieux guest-starred on two episodes of Dr. Kildare alongside Richard Chamberlain. She played a surfer suffering from epilepsy, a performance that was much acclaimed and led to a 1965 Golden Globe nomination for "Best Actress In A Television Series". 

Mimieux made a cameo as herself in Looking for Love (1964) starring Connie Francis and played Richard Chamberlain's love interest in Joy in the Morning (1965), a melodrama.

Post-MGM
Mimieux was in a Western with Max von Sydow for 20th Century Fox, The Reward (1965); the Disney comedy Monkeys, Go Home! (1967); and a heist film The Caper of the Golden Bulls (1967).

Mimieux did The Desperate Hours (1967) for TV and was reunited with Rod Taylor in the MGM action movie Dark of the Sun (1968). In 1968, she narrated a classical music concert at the Hollywood Bowl.

In 1969, Mimieux was top-billed in Three in the Attic a hit for AIP, and appeared in the critically acclaimed 1969 movie The Picasso Summer alongside Albert Finney. The following year, she was the female lead in The Delta Factor (1970), an action film.

Television
Mimieux had one of the leads in The Most Deadly Game (1970–1971), a short-lived TV series from Aaron Spelling. She replaced Inger Stevens, who had been slated to star, but committed suicide one month before production began. For this role, Mimieux was nominated for the 1971 Golden Globe Award for Best Television Actress – Drama Series.

Around 1971, Mimieux had a business selling Haitian products and studied archeology; she would travel several months of each year. After making the TV movies Death Takes a Holiday (1971) and Black Noon (1971), she sued her agent for not providing her with movie work despite having taken her money.

Mimieux was an air hostess in MGM's Skyjacked (1972), starring Charlton Heston and was in the Fox science-fiction film The Neptune Factor (1973).

By the early 1970s, Mimieux was unhappy with the roles offered to actresses:"The women they [male screenwriters] write are all one dimensional. They have no complexity in their lives. It's all surface. There's nothing to play. They're either sex objects or vanilla pudding."

Mimieux had been writing for several years prior to this film, mostly journalism and short stories. She had the idea for a story about a Pirandello-like theme:"...the study of a woman, the difference between what she appears to be and what she is: appearance vs reality...[the more I thought about the character] the more I wanted to play her. Here was the kind of nifty, multifaceted part I'd been looking for. So instead of a short story, I wrote it as a film."

Mimieux wrote a thriller, which she took to producers Aaron Spelling and Leonard Goldberg, who then produced it for ABC as a television film. It aired as Hit Lady (1974).

In 1975, Mimieux starred in The Legend of Valentino (as Rudolph Valentino's second wife, Natacha Rambova), and in the Canadian thriller Journey into Fear. In 1976, Mimieux made a pilot for a TV sitcom based on Bell, Book and Candle, but it was not picked up.

Later movies
Mimieux played a falsely imprisoned woman victimized by a sadistic guard in the film Jackson County Jail (1976) with Tommy Lee Jones for New World Pictures, which was a box-office hit.

Mimieux appeared in such horror-oriented TV movies as Snowbeast (1977), Devil Dog: The Hound of Hell (1978), and Disaster on the Coastliner (1979). She also appeared in the TV movies Ransom for Alice! (1977) and Outside Chance (1978).

Later, she co-starred in the first PG-rated Walt Disney Productions feature, The Black Hole (1979). She had the lead in Circle of Power (1981).

Mimieux appeared in the TV movie Forbidden Love (1982) and Night Partners (1983) and guest-starred on The Love Boat and Lime Street. She made Obsessive Love (1984), a television film about a female stalker which she co-wrote and co-produced:"There are few enough films going these days, and there are three or four women who are offered all the good parts. Of course I could play a lot of awful parts that are too depressing to contemplate.... [Television] is not the love affair I have with film, but television can be a playground for interesting ideas. I love wild, baroque, slightly excessive theatrical ideas, and because television needs so much material, there's a chance to get some of those odd ideas done."Farber, Stephen. "MIMIEUX PRODUCES A MOVIE FOR TV", New York Times, October 1, 1984.

Mimieux had the lead in Berrenger's (1985), a short-lived TV series and had a supporting role in the TV movie The Fifth Missile (1986). She guest-starred in a TV movie Perry Mason: The Case of the Desperate Deception (1990). Her last film was Lady Boss (1992).

Personal life and death
Mimieux was married three times but had no children. At age 17, she wed Evan Harland Engber on December 19, 1959, but kept the marriage secret for almost two years. She was married, secondly, to film director Stanley Donen from 1972 until their divorce in 1985. Her last marriage was to Howard F. Ruby, chairman emeritus and co-founder of Oakwood Worldwide. Mimieux died at her home in Los Angeles on January 18, 2022.

Filmography

 A Certain Smile (1958) - (uncredited)
 Platinum High School (1960) - Lorinda Nibley
 The Time Machine (1960) - Weena
 Where the Boys Are (1960) - Melanie Tolman
 The Four Horsemen of the Apocalypse (1962) - Chi Chi Desnoyers
 Light in the Piazza (1962) - Clara Johnson
 The Wonderful World of the Brothers Grimm (1962) - The Princess ('The Dancing Princess')
 Diamond Head (1962) - Sloane Howland
 Toys in the Attic (1963) - Lily Berniers
 Looking for Love (1964) - Yvette Mimieux
 Joy in the Morning (1965) - Annie Brown née McGairy
 The Reward (1965) - Sylvia
 Monkeys, Go Home! (1967) - Maria Riserau
 The Caper of the Golden Bulls (1967) - Grace Harvey
 Dark of the Sun (1968) - Claire
 Three in the Attic (1968) - Tobey Clinton
 The Picasso Summer (1969) - Alice Smith
 The Delta Factor (1970) - Kim Stacy
 Skyjacked (1972) - Angela Thacher
 The Neptune Factor (1973) - Dr. Leah Jansen
 Journey Into Fear (1975) - Josette
 Jackson County Jail (1976) - Dinah Hunter
 The Black Hole (1979) - Dr. Kate McCrae
 Circle of Power (1981) - Bianca Ray
 The Fascination (1985)
 The Fantasy Film Worlds of George Pal (1985, documentary) - Weena (in The Time Machine) (archive footage)

Television work

 Yancy Derringer (1959, Episode: "Collector's Item") - Ricky
 Alcoa Presents: One Step Beyond (1960, Episode: "The Clown") - Nonnie Regan
 Mr. Lucky (1960, Episode: "Stacked Deck") - Margot
 Dr. Kildare (1964, 2 episodes) - Pat Holmes
 The Desperate Hours (1967, TV movie) - Cindy Hilliard
 The Most Deadly Game (1970–1971) - Vanessa Smith
 Death Takes a Holiday (1971, TV movie) - Peggy Chapman
 Black Noon (1971, TV movie) - Deliverance
 Hit Lady (1974, TV movie) - Angela de Vries
 The Legend of Valentino (1975, TV movie) - Natacha Rambova
 Bell, Book and Candle (1976, TV movie) - Gillian Holroyd
 Snowbeast (1977, TV movie) - Ellen Seberg
 Ransom for Alice! (1977, TV movie) - Jenny Cullen
 Devil Dog: The Hound of Hell (1978, TV movie) - Betty Barry
 Outside Chance (1978, TV movie) - Dinah Hunter
 Disaster on the Coastliner (1979, TV movie) - Paula Harvey
 Forbidden Love (1982 film) (1982, TV movie) - Joanna Bittan
 Night Partners (1983, TV movie) - Elizabeth McGuire
 The Love Boat (1984, Episode: "Hong Kong Affair") - Leni Martek
 Obsessive Love (film) (1984, TV movie) - Linda Foster
 Berrenger's (1985, canceled after 12 episodes) - Shane Bradley
 The Fifth Missile (1986, TV movie) - Cheryl Leary
 Perry Mason: The Case of the Desperate Deception (1990, TV movie) - Danielle Altmann
 Lady Boss (1992, TV Series) - Deena Swanson (final appearance)

Recordings
 The Wonderful World of the Brothers Grimm 1962 (MGM Records), as The Dancing Princess
 Baudelaire's Flowers of Evil (Les Fleurs Du Mal) 1968 (Connoisseur Society), reading excerpts of Cyril Scott's 1909 translation with music by Ali Akbar Khan

References

Notes

Citations

External links

 
 
 
 
 
 Yvette Mimieux Gallery

1942 births
2022 deaths
20th-century American actresses
Actresses from Los Angeles
American actresses of Mexican descent
American businesspeople
American film actresses
American people of French descent
American television actresses
Metro-Goldwyn-Mayer contract players